
Gmina Słupia is a rural gmina (administrative district) in Jędrzejów County, Świętokrzyskie Voivodeship, in south-central Poland.

Villages
Gmina Słupia contains the villages and settlements of Dąbrowica, Jasieniec, Nowa Wieś, Nowy Węgrzynów, Obiechów, Raszków, Rawka, Rożnica, Sieńsko, Słupia, Sprowa, Stary Węgrzynów, Wielkopole and Wywła.

Neighbouring gminas
Gmina Słupia is bordered by the gminas of Moskorzew, Nagłowice, Sędziszów, Szczekociny and Żarnowiec.

References
Polish official population figures 2006

Slupia
Jędrzejów County